BJU may relate to
Beijing Jiaotong University, a Chinese university
Bob Jones University, an American university
 BJU Press, a publisher
Bundesverband Junger Unternehmer, a German association of entrepreneurs
BJU International, an academic journal
 BJU, the IATA code of the Bajura Airport in Nepal
bju, the ISO 639 code of the Busuu language of Cameroon